Lieutenant General Christoffel Pierre "Joffel" van der Westhuizen is a South African Army general from the artillery., who served as Chief of Staff Intelligence for the Defence Force from 1991 - 1994.

Military career
He served in the artillery as a junior officer. As a brigadier, he served as the OC Eastern Province Command in 1983 - 1987. GOC Witwatersrand Command in 1987 - 1990. He served as Deputy Chief of the Army in 1990 until he was appointed to the Military Intelligence Division in 1991 as the Chief of Staff Intelligence, a post he held until 1994. He went on early retirement in 1994.

Awards and decorations

References

South African Army generals
South African military personnel of the Border War
1942 births
Living people
Afrikaner people
South African people of Dutch descent